Robert Thomas Hanford Leivers (27 December 1914 – 28 August 1964) was an English freestyle swimmer who competed for Great Britain in the 1932 Summer Olympics and in the 1936 Summer Olympics. He was born in Nottingham and died in Chelsea, London.

In 1932 he finished fifth with the British relay team in the 4×200 metre freestyle relay event. He also participated in the 400 metre freestyle competition was eliminated in the first round.

Four years later he was a member of the British relay team which finished sixth in the 4×200 metre freestyle relay contest. He also finished sixth in the 1500 metre freestyle event and seventh in the 400 metre freestyle competition.

At the British Empire Games in 1934 he won a silver medal as part of the English team in the 2×220 yards relay race. In 1938 he won the 1500 yards contest and finished second in the 400 yards event and as member of the English relay team he won his second gold medal.

During his athletic years he was famous for his friendly rivalry with fellow Potteries swimmer Norman Wainwright; they both trained at Longton Swimming Baths, which have now been demolished.

Bob lived in Stoke-on-Trent, Staffordshire where he ran the family business, Leivers Butchers with shops in Longton, Staffordshire and Meir, Staffordshire. He married Winifred May Leivers (née Degg) and fathered two children; Patricia Ann McLaughlin (née Leivers) and Robert Thomas Hanford Leivers.

See also
 List of Commonwealth Games medallists in swimming (men)

External links
 
 
 "In the Swim" (1934), British Pathé newsreel of Bob Leivers swimming at Winsford, Cheshire

1914 births
1964 deaths
Sportspeople from Nottingham
English male freestyle swimmers
Olympic swimmers of Great Britain
Swimmers at the 1932 Summer Olympics
Swimmers at the 1936 Summer Olympics
Swimmers at the 1934 British Empire Games
Swimmers at the 1938 British Empire Games
Commonwealth Games gold medallists for England
Commonwealth Games silver medallists for England
European Aquatics Championships medalists in swimming
Commonwealth Games medallists in swimming
English butchers
Medallists at the 1934 British Empire Games
Medallists at the 1938 British Empire Games